Juan de Ribera, O.S.A. (1588-1666) was a Roman Catholic prelate who served as Bishop of Santa Cruz de la Sierra (1659–1666).

Biography
Juan de Ribera was born in Pisco, Peru and ordained a priest in the Order of Saint Augustine. On November 17, 1659, he was selected by the King of Spain and confirmed by Pope Paul V as Bishop of Santa Cruz de la Sierra. In 1660, he was consecrated bishop and succeeded to the bishopric. He served as Bishop of Santa Cruz de la Sierra until his death in 1666.

References

External links and additional sources
 (for Chronology of Bishops) 
 (for Chronology of Bishops) 

1588 births
1666 deaths
People from Pisco, Peru
Bishops appointed by Pope Paul V
Augustinian bishops
17th-century Roman Catholic bishops in Bolivia
Roman Catholic bishops of Santa Cruz de la Sierra